Can You Feel It? is the ninth extended play by South Korean boy group Highlight formerly known as Beast. It was released on March 20, 2017 by Around Us Entertainment and distributed by LOEN Entertainment. This is the first album the group has released since leaving Cube Entertainment, under their rebranded name of Highlight.

The album consists of six new tracks including the lead single "Plz Don't Be Sad" and the pre-release single "It's Still Beautiful".

On May 29, 2017 Highlight released a repackaged version of their ninth extended play album with 2 new songs in addition to the songs from their ninth extended play album Can You Feel It?, including the title track "Calling You".

Track listing
Credits are adapted from Naver.

Chart performance

References

2017 EPs
Korean-language EPs
Kakao M EPs
Highlight (band) EPs